The year 2000 is the 8th year in the history of the Ultimate Fighting Championship (UFC), a mixed martial arts promotion based in the United States. In 2000 the UFC held 6 events beginning with, UFC 24: First Defense.

Title fights

Debut UFC fighters

The following fighters fought their first UFC fight in 2000:

Aaron Brink
Adrian Serrano
Alex Stiebling
Alexandre Dantas
Andrei Arlovski
Ben Earwood
Bob Cook
Bobby Hoffman
Brad Gumm
Chris Lytle
CJ Fernandes
Dave Menne
David Dodd

David Velasquez
Dennis Hallman
Gan McGee
Ian Freeman
Ikuhisa Minowa
Jeff Monson
Jermaine Andre
Joao Roque
John Alessio
Josh Barnett
Koji Oishi
Lance Gibson
Marcelo Aguiar
Mark Hughes

Matt Lindland
Murilo Bustamante
Nate Schroeder
Renato Sobral
Sanae Kikuta
Satoshi Honma
Scott Adams
Shonie Carter
Tedd Williams
Tiki Ghosn
Tyrone Roberts
Yuki Kondo

Events list

UFC 27: Ultimate Bad Boyz

UFC 27 was an event held in New Orleans, Louisiana, and the last event event held by the UFC before its adoption of the new "Unified Rules of Mixed Martial Arts".

Results

See also
 UFC
 List of UFC champions
 List of UFC events

References

Ultimate Fighting Championship by year
2000 in mixed martial arts